George Wilson Scott (1895-1962) was a Major League Baseball pitcher.

Sources

Major League Baseball pitchers
St. Louis Cardinals players
Beaumont Exporters players
Austin Rangers players
Texarkana Twins players
Greenville Hunters players
Vicksburg Hill Billies players
Pueblo Steelworkers players
Baseball players from Iowa
People from Benton County, Oregon
1895 births
1962 deaths
Burials at Willamette National Cemetery